The South Dakota State Jackrabbits Men's Basketball team is a basketball team that represents South Dakota State University in Brookings, South Dakota. The Jackrabbits are an NCAA Division I member and have played in the Summit League since 2007.  The team has a 1535–1040–1 (.592) overall record.

South Dakota State has traditionally been very successful in men's basketball. Prior to moving to Division I in 2004, the Jackrabbits were a power while in Division II.  The team won 20 conference championships with the North Central Conference, advanced to the NCAA Division II Tournament 24 times, and won the 1963 NCAA College Division basketball tournament. Although initially struggling after the move to Division I, the team increased their win total each season, culminating in their first 20 win season at the Division I level in 2011–2012 and advancing to their first NCAA Division I Tournament.  The team has advanced to postseason play every season since then besides 2021. 

On March 8, 2022, the Jackrabbits advanced to their sixth NCAA tournament with a record of 30-4, a school record. They did it on a 21 game win streak (longest in the nation) and went 21-0 against Summit League opponents, something that had never been done before in conference history. 

The Jackrabbits play their home games at the 6,500 seat Frost Arena. Eric Henderson was named head coach of the Jackrabbits on March 27, 2019, after serving as Associate Head Coach under T.J. Otzelberger who had been named head coach at the University of Nevada-Las Vegas. The Jackrabbits have produced 7 NBA draft picks including Nate Wolters, Steve Lingenfelter, Tom Black. Cerci Mahone was picked up as a free agent and played for Denver.

Postseason

NCAA Division I Tournament results

The Jackrabbits have appeared in six NCAA Division I Tournaments. Their combined record is 0–6.

From 2011 to 2015 the round of 64 was known as the second round

NIT results
The Jackrabbits have appeared in two National Invitation Tournament (NIT). Their record is 1–2.

CBI results
The Jackrabbits have appeared in one College Basketball Invitational (CBI). Their record is 0–1.

NCAA Division II Tournament results
The Jackrabbits have appeared in the NCAA Division II Tournament 24 times (known as the college division until 1974 but considered the same tournament). Their combined record is 36–23. They were National Champions in 1963, and runners-up in 1985.

Current coaching staff

Records

All-Time Leaders
*Accurate as of end of 2018–19 season. See all-time records on gojacks.com—access-date=2019-04-18

Points

Assists

Rebounds

Media coverage 

All home and road games are covered on the Jackrabbit Sports Network.  The broadcast range of the Jackrabbit Sports Network covers eight states (South Dakota, Minnesota, North Dakota, Iowa, Nebraska, Missouri, Kansas, and Wyoming), and consists of the following stations:
WNAX 570AM (Flagship Station)
KJJQ 910AM
KRKI 99.1FM
KGFX 1060AM
KSDR 1480AM

The team does not have an official television partner, but Jackrabbit games have been televised on Midco Sports Net, Fox College Sports, the Big Ten Network, ESPN2, ESPNU, and local television networks.

References

External links